Marcén is a locality located in the municipality of Lalueza, in Huesca province, Aragon, Spain. As of 2020, it has a population of 58.

Geography 
Marcén is located 44km south-southeast of Huesca.

References

Populated places in the Province of Huesca